Susyana Tjhan (born 19 November 1984) is an Indonesian former wushu taolu athlete. She won the bronze medal at the 2008 Beijing Wushu Tournament, that was held in tandem with the 2008 Summer Olympic, in the women's changquan event. She became champion at the 2001 Southeast Asian Games, where she also won a bronze medal and became again champion at the 2009 Southeast Asian Games. She won the silver medal at the 2006 Asian Games and the silver medal at the 2010 Asian Games. At the 2009 World Games she won the bronze medal.

References

1984 births
Living people
Indonesian people of Chinese descent
Indonesian sportspeople of Chinese descent
Indonesian sportswomen
Indonesian wushu practitioners
Sportspeople from Jakarta
Competitors at the 2008 Beijing Wushu Tournament
Asian Games medalists in wushu
Wushu practitioners at the 2002 Asian Games
Wushu practitioners at the 2006 Asian Games
Wushu practitioners at the 2010 Asian Games
Asian Games bronze medalists for Indonesia
Asian Games silver medalists for Indonesia
Medalists at the 2006 Asian Games
Medalists at the 2010 Asian Games
World Games bronze medalists
World Games medalists in wushu
Southeast Asian Games medalists in wushu
Southeast Asian Games gold medalists for Indonesia
Southeast Asian Games silver medalists for Indonesia
Southeast Asian Games bronze medalists for Indonesia